Ivanci is a small village southeast of Bogojina in the Municipality of Moravske Toplice in the Prekmurje region of Slovenia.

References

External links 
Ivanci on Geopedia

Populated places in the Municipality of Moravske Toplice